Kirsty is a fictional character from the Hellraiser media franchise. Created by writer Clive Barker, Kirsty first appears in the 1986 novella The Hellbound Heart. Her full name is identified in the sequels as Kirsty Singer, before being adapted in the 1987 film adaptation Hellraiser as Kirsty Cotton. The character served as a major focus in the original film and its sequel Hellbound: Hellraiser II, later playing a supporting role in Hellraiser VI: Hellseeker. In all of her appearances in the film series, she was portrayed by actress Ashley Laurence. The film describes her as being Larry Cotton's daughter, while in the novel she is simply a friend of his.

Appearances

In film
Kirsty first appears in Hellraiser as the teenage daughter of Larry Cotton (Andrew Robinson) and stepdaughter of his second wife Julia Cotton (Clare Higgins). Kirsty moves with her parents to England to the house of her uncle Frank Cotton (Sean Chapman), who has disappeared sometime ago, but refuses to live with her parents, instead opting to live in a place of her own. When passing by her parents house one day, Kirsty sees Julia and a man enter the place and, believing Julia to be cheating on her father, follows the two inside and up to the attic of the house. It is there that Kirsty witnesses Julia attack the man and her uncle Frank, who is now a skinless entity needing to feast on the blood of others for nourishment, begin to eat him. When the man tries to escape, Frank chases after him and discovers Kirsty, whom he tries to attack, before stopping when she grabs the nearby Lemarchand's box. Realizing the puzzle box has some significance to Frank, Kirsty tosses it out a window, distracting him and allowing her to escape outside where she, after picking up the box, collapses. Found and taken to a hospital, Kirsty wakes up and, at first believing everything that has happened to be a dream, realizes she is wrong when a doctor hands her the box. Toying with the puzzle box, Kirsty solves and inadvertently summons the sadomasochistic demons known as the Cenobites and their leader, Pinhead (Doug Bradley). Kirsty bargains with the Cenobites, revealing to them that she knows where the escaped Frank is and offering them him instead of herself. After escaping from the hospital (presumably with the assistance of the Cenobites), she returns to her father's house and encounters Julia and her father, who claim Frank is dead and shows her his body. This turns out to be a ruse, as it is actually Larry who is dead, Frank having killed him and taken his skin to wear as a disguise. Trying to kill Kirsty when the Cenobites reappear, Frank accidentally stabs Julia to death and is in turn killed by the Cenobites with hooks. With Frank and Julia dealt with, the Cenobites turn their attention to Kirsty, who, while fleeing from them, stumbles upon Lemarchand's box which Julia's corpse is clutching and, using it, manages to banish the Cenobites back to their dimension. With the Cenobites gone, Kirsty attempts to destroy the puzzle box once and for all by burning it, but while in the midst of doing so, a man grabs it from the fire and transforms into a winged, skeletal creature before flying away.

In Hellbound: Hellraiser II, Kirsty is in the Channard Institute, a psychiatric hospital, after being traumatized by the events of Hellraiser. She tells the head doctor of the hospital, Dr. Philip Channard (Kenneth Cranham), and his assistant Kyle MacRae (William Hope), about her experiences with the Cenobites. Kirsty begs them to destroy the mattress that her stepmother died on, believing that it connects to the Cenobites realm. Dr. Channard is revealed to have been searching for Lemarchand's box for most of his life. He summons Julia from the mattress by having a mentally ill patient cut himself on it. As the patient sees bugs crawling all over his skin because he is hallucinating them and he uses a razor to cut them off of himself. He is bleeding so badly the blood awakens Julia and she eats him. Kirsty asks for Kyles' help in stopping whatever it is Channard plans to do. Going to Channard's house alongside Kyle, Kirsty plans to use the Lament Configuration to resurrect her father. Kyle is killed and eaten by Julia. Then Kirsty, Channard and another patient of Channard's (the seemingly-mute Tiffany (Imogen Boorman)) are taken to the Cenobites' realm. After an encounter between Julia and Frank, with the former killing the latter, Kirsty and Tiffany are attacked by the Cenobites. Before the Cenobites torture them, Kirsty reveals to Pinhead a picture of a man identical in appearance to him she found in Channard's office. Seeing the picture, Pinhead and the other Cenobites realize that they were once human, minutes before being killed by Channard, now a Cenobite himself. As Channard returns to his psychiatric institute and goes on a rampage, Kirsty has Tiffany re-solve the Lemarchand's box while she uses Julia's skin to disguise herself as her. Lured back to the Cenobites' realm, Channard tries to kill Tiffany, only to be fooled by the disguised Kirsty and be accidentally killed by Leviathan. With Channard dead, Kirsty and Tiffany manage to escape back to Earth using the puzzle box.

Kirsty makes a small cameo appearance in Hellraiser III: Hell on Earth in several videos taken from the Channard Institute that protagonist Joey Summerskill (Terry Farrell) watches to learn about the Cenobites.

Kirsty returns in the sixth installment of the Hellraiser series, Hellraiser: Hellseeker, where she has married a man named Trevor Gooden (Dean Winters), and supposedly died in a car crash, which Trevor has incurred amnesia from. Attempting to piece his life back together, Trevor's past is revealed to him by Pinhead, who tells Trevor that he repeatedly cheated on Kirsty and had conspired with a friend to kill her using Lemarchand's box. Trevor's plan backfired, as, after summoning Pinhead and the Cenobites, Kirsty proposed to give them five souls for her own. Pinhead reveals to Trevor that Kirsty had killed three of his mistresses and his friend, and that he is the fifth sacrifice. Trevor is in the Cenobites' realm, Kirsty shot him in the head while the two were driving, which caused the car accident. The film's final shot has Kirsty leaving a crime scene with Lermanchand's box, having escaped all conviction by framing Trevor for the murders she committed before killing him.

In literature
Kirsty originates from the novel The Hellbound Heart. This version is not Rory Cotton's daughter, but rather a friend who shares a romantic interest in him. The 2018 sequel to The Hellbound Heart, Hellraiser: The Toll, identifies the character as Kirsty Singer. Kirsty reappears in Boom! Studios' Hellraiser comic series, set roughly twenty years after the events of the third film. By issue #8, she becomes a Cenobite, a female Pinhead, as the original Pinhead becomes human again.

Reception
In Divine Horror: Essays on the Cinematic Battle Between the Sacred and the Diabolical, Cynthia J. Miller and A. Bowdoin Van Riper note the differences between Kirsty and Julia:
"...in ''Hellraiser'''s portrayals of Kirsty and Julia as "light" and "dark" characters respectively, embodying "a universal duality" that, in the Western world, is traditionally associated with good and evil, angel and demons".
"The actions of the two women become equally polarized as the film moves toward its climax. Julia emerges as a seductress who lures men to their deaths in order to harvest their blood and Kirsty as a virtuous "final girl" whose only goal is survival. The film then moves toward a final battle--a conclusion that is absent in the novella--between the forces of good and evil, in which Kirsty banishes the demons to Hell".

See also 
 Final girl

References 

Hellraiser characters
Literary characters introduced in 1986
Fictional characters who have made pacts with devils
Fictional serial killers
Final girls
Characters in American novels of the 20th century
Teenage characters in film